Everton Kempes dos Santos Gonçalves (3 August 1982 – 28 November 2016), commonly known as Kempes, was a Brazilian footballer who last played as a forward for Chapecoense. 

Kempes was one of the victims when LaMia Airlines Flight 2933 crashed on 28 November 2016.

Club career
Born in Carpina, Pernambuco, Kempes moved to Rio de Janeiro at early age, and joined Canto do Rio at the age of 17 after impressing on a trial. He was promoted to the first team in 2001, and subsequently represented Nacional de Muriaé before joining Série A club Paraná in 2004.

After being rarely used, Kempes moved to Espírito Santo and played for Estrela do Norte and Vitória, winning the 2006 Campeonato Capixaba with the latter. Spells at Sertãozinho and 15 de Novembro de Campo Bom followed before signing a contract with Ceará on 11 July 2007.

In 2008 Kempes joined Caxias, and after being the club's top goalscorer in the year's Campeonato Gaúcho, signed for Ipatinga on loan; at the latter he scored his first top tier goal, in a 2–1 home win against Fluminense on 10 August. On 11 January 2009, he was presented at Criciúma.

On 4 June 2009, Kempes was transferred to Portuguesa, who bought 70% of his federative rights. He failed to impress during his spell at Lusa, and subsequently served loan spells at Novo Hamburgo, Ceará, América Mineiro and Cerezo Osaka before joining JEF United Chiba permanently on 1 February 2013.

Kempes returned to Brazil on 2 March 2015, signing for Joinville. On 16 December 2015, he joined state rivals Chapecoense.

Death 

Kempes was one of the 71 fatal victims from LaMia Airlines Flight 2933 crash, on 28 November 2016. The aircraft was taking the Chapecoense team to Medellin where they would play the first match of finals of 2016 Copa Sudamericana.

Club statistics
.

Honours

Club
Estrela do Norte
Copa Espírito Santo: 2005

Vitória-ES
Campeonato Capixaba: 2006

Portuguesa
Campeonato Brasileiro Série B: 2011

Chapecoense
Campeonato Catarinense: 2016
Copa Sudamericana: 2016 (posthumously)

Individual
JEF United Chiba
J2 League Top Goalscorer: 2013 (22 goals)

References

External links
 

1982 births
2016 deaths
Brazilian footballers
Association football forwards
Campeonato Brasileiro Série A players
Campeonato Brasileiro Série B players
Campeonato Brasileiro Série C players
Paraná Clube players
Estrela do Norte Futebol Clube players
Vitória Futebol Clube (ES) players
Sertãozinho Futebol Clube players
Ceará Sporting Club players
Associação Portuguesa de Desportos players
América Futebol Clube (MG) players
Criciúma Esporte Clube players
Ipatinga Futebol Clube players
Sociedade Esportiva e Recreativa Caxias do Sul players
Joinville Esporte Clube players
Associação Chapecoense de Futebol players
J1 League players
J2 League players
Cerezo Osaka players
JEF United Chiba players
Brazilian expatriate footballers
Brazilian expatriate sportspeople in Japan
Expatriate footballers in Japan
Footballers killed in the LaMia Flight 2933 crash
Sportspeople from Pernambuco